The canton of Bourg-Saint-Maurice is an administrative division of the Savoie department, southeastern France. Its borders were modified at the French canton reorganisation which came into effect in March 2015. Its seat is in Bourg-Saint-Maurice.

It consists of the following communes:

Aime-la-Plagne
Bourg-Saint-Maurice
Les Chapelles
Landry
Montvalezan
Peisey-Nancroix
La Plagne-Tarentaise
Sainte-Foy-Tarentaise
Séez
Tignes
Val-d'Isère
Villaroger

References

Cantons of Savoie